The MIT $100K Entrepreneurship Competition is a student-managed business plan competition, where undergraduates and postgraduates from various programs and all levels at the Massachusetts Institute of Technology (MIT) organize and enter the competition. Teams must include at least one full-time MIT student, but membership is not limited to the MIT community.  The competition is supported by the MIT Entrepreneurship Center at the MIT Sloan School of Management. Every year a total of $300,000 is distributed as non-dilutive grant money. Since 1990, over 160 companies have been started as a result of the competition, generating 4,600 jobs, receiving over $1.3 billion in follow-up venture capital funding and totaling a cumulative market value of over $15 billion.

Process

The competition started in 1990 as the $10K competition and continued to grow throughout the 1990s.  In 1996 the $10K evolved into the $50K with $30K going to the winner and $10K to each of two runners-up. In 2006, the $50K grant competition also added another aspect to the competition focused on business plans for low-income communities to complement the traditional business venture competition. Subsequently, the competition has rebranded itself with a bigger grant amount of $100K and is called as MIT $100K Pitch Contest.

MIT $100K PITCH Contest
The MIT $100K Pitch Contest is organized yearly by the MIT $100K organizing committee. Intended to provide a way for entrepreneurs with ideas to form teams, it is held in the fall. The contest is a warm-up event for the Executive Summary Contest, held in the winter, and the Business Plan Contest held in the spring. In the Elevator Pitch Contest, each contestant is given 60 seconds in front of a crowd to give their "elevator pitch" with the winner receiving a cash prize. This contest is open to the public.

MIT $100K ACCELERATE Contest
The MIT $100K ACCELERATE Contest replaced the MIT $100K Executive Summary Contest in 2011. It is held in the winter of academic year and is intended to help teams build a robust prototype for their start-up idea. Teams work on creating a demonstration of their idea over December and January, and the best selected are ACCELERATE Finale Show. MIT $100K provides resources and mentorship to help teams build their demonstrations, which will be reviewed by a panel of judges, with the winner receiving a cash prize.

MIT $100K LAUNCH - Business Plan Contest
The MIT $100K Launch Contest is the flagship of the MIT $100K Entrepreneurship Competition. In the spring, semi-finalists are selected from all business plan submissions. LAUNCH is the final contest in the $100K cycle. Participants present full-scale business plans for the chance to win a $100,000 Grand Prize.

Winners - Business Plan Contest

Notable companies formed through the competition
Since its founding, the $100K Competition has helped launch more than 60 companies with an aggregate value of greater than $10.5 billion. Prominent $100K alumni companies include Akamai, net. Genesis, and C-Bridge.

History: MIT $10K/$50K/$100K Entrepreneurial Competition
The competition was founded in the 1989–1990 academic year and was initially intended as a promotional vehicle for the MIT Entrepreneurs Club (now the MIT E-Club.) Club members Richard Durling-Shyduroff and Douglas Ling along with club Founder Peter Mui envisioned a cross-campus event that brought MIT's varied schools together to identify and support innovative ideas on campus. The goal was to create a safe, nurturing, (relatively controlled) sandbox environment where fledgling entrepreneurs could try their wings. The lead alumni donor was George Hatsopoulos of Thermo Electron. with additional generous support from other alumni, the Sloan School (Dean Lester Thurow) and Engineering School (Acting Dean Jack Kerrebrock.)

Managing Directors

Entrepreneurship for Development Competition
The Entrepreneurship for Development Competition is a competition for business plans that are judged on the following criteria: uniqueness of business idea, management strength, path to sustainability and social impact.  The competition was added in 2006 as a complement to the Business Venture Competition due to increasing demand and interest in socially conscious ideas.  In the spring, semi-finalists are selected from all business plan submissions.  Semi-finalists submit more detailed business plans, and 5-6 finalists are then chosen.  At the awards ceremony, the top team is awarded the Entrepreneurship for Development grand prize.

Winners - Entrepreneurship for Development Competition
In 1998, a dual award within the Venture Competition was awarded to a pair of finalists including Volunteer Community Connection.  At the time, VCC was a non-traditional entry into the competition and
has since served as a motivating example for the genesis of the MIT $100K Developmental Entrepreneurship Competition.  As a result, they are listed as a winner and implicitly as an innovator within the Entrepreneurship for Development Competition.

See also
 Best of Biotech
 LiquiGlide

References

External links
 Official site
 A Look at 22 Years of the MIT $100K Entrepreneurship Competition & 10 Teams Who've Paved the Way

Massachusetts Institute of Technology student life
Recurring events established in 1990
Business plan competitions
Student competitions